Graham Gordon Glenn  (born 30 July 1933) is a former senior Australian public servant.

Career
Graham Glenn joined the Commonwealth public service in 1950 as a cadet in the Department of Trade and Customs.

Glenn was appointed Commissioner of the Public Service Board as in 1984, having been with the Board since 1958 and previously having served as Deputy Commissioner starting in 1977.

In July 1987, Glenn was appointed Secretary of the Australian Government Department of Administrative Services, serving in that role until March 1989 when he was to become the Secretary of the Department of Industrial Relations. He was head of Industrial Relations until March 1992, 
In 1995, Glenn was appointed Chair of the ACT Bushfire Task Force, responsible for reviewing practices for bushfire fuel management in the ACT and for recommending appropriate policies and practices for future bushfire fuel management.

Awards
In January 1993, Glenn was made an Officer of the Order of Australia. He was awarded the Centenary Medal in 2001 for service to Australian society through public service leadership.

References

Living people
Australian public servants
Officers of the Order of Australia
Recipients of the Centenary Medal
1933 births